Yingshan County is one of the seven counties governed by the prefecture-level city of Huanggang, Hubei, located on the eastern edge of the province, adjoining Anhui, and encompassing the southwestern portion of the Dabie Mountains.

History
Yingshan is famous as the birthplace of Bi Sheng, the inventor of movable-type printing technology in the 11th century, which is regarded as one of ancient China's Four Great Inventions.

Geography

Administrative divisions
Yingshan County administers eight towns and three townships:

Climate

Economy

Transportation 
China National Highway 318

Gallery

References

 
 

Huanggang
Counties of Hubei